Jamie Reid (born 11 January 1994) is a Scottish professional footballer, who plays for Brechin City as a winger. Reid has previously played for Dundee, Stenhousemuir, Montrose, Arbroath, Elgin City and Lochee United.

Career
A member of the Dundee under 19 squad, Reid was promoted to the first team on 23 July 2011, where he was an unused substitute in their victory over Arbroath in the Challenge Cup. He was an unused substitute on one further occasion, before making his debut aged 18, from the start on 5 May 2012, he scored the only goal in a 1–0 victory over Livingston.

He made his first appearance of the 2012–13 season as a substitute on 31 July 2012, in a 0–0 draw against Brechin City in the League Cup, with Dundee winning on penalties. Following Dundee's promotion to the Scottish Premier League he was given the squad number 33 for the new season.

In January 2013, Reid joined Stenhousemuir on loan, scoring twice and creating a number of assists during his thirteen games at Ochilview Park. Upon his return to Dundee, Reid signed a new two-year contract keeping him at the Dark Blues until 2015. In December 2013, Reid moved on loan to Montrose for one month, with the loan being extended for the rest of the 2013–14 season in January 2014.

In July 2014, Reid was loaned out again, agreeing to a second spell at Stenhousemuir. After returning to Dundee, he moved on loan on 30 January 2015, to Elgin City for the remainder of the 2014–15 season. On 14 May 2015, Reid was released from Dundee alongside teammate Iain Davidson by mutual consent.

Shortly after leaving Dundee, Reid was signed by Scottish League Two side Arbroath

After one season with Arbroath, Reid returned to Elgin City for his second spell with the club. In November 2017, he joined Junior club Lochee United in a swap deal with defender Aaron Whitehead.

On 11 July 2019, Reid returned to the senior leagues, signing for Brechin City.

Career statistics

References

1994 births
Living people
Footballers from Dundee
Scottish footballers
Association football midfielders
Scottish Football League players
Dundee F.C. players
Stenhousemuir F.C. players
Montrose F.C. players
Elgin City F.C. players
Arbroath F.C. players
Scottish Professional Football League players
Lochee United F.C. players
Brechin City F.C. players